The Wickham A Bluebird is an all-metal four passenger homebuilt aircraft designed by Boeing engineer Jim Wickham.

Design
The Bluebird is an all-metal four place strut-braced high-wing aircraft with conventional landing gear. The wings feature full-span flaperons.

Operational history
The prototype Wickham A was the first of six designs by Wickham, and first flight was after seven years of construction starting in 1948. The first flight was from Boeing field in Seattle, Washington.

Specifications (Wickham A Bluebird)

See also

References

Homebuilt aircraft
High-wing aircraft
1950s United States sport aircraft
Single-engined tractor aircraft
Aircraft first flown in 1955
Conventional landing gear